Cons-Sainte-Colombe was a commune in the Haute-Savoie department in the Rhône-Alpes region in south-eastern France. On 1 January 2016 it was merged with Marlens to create the new commune Val-de-Chaise. Its population was 393 in 2019.

See also
Communes of the Haute-Savoie department

References

Former communes of Haute-Savoie
Populated places disestablished in 2016